Amphibian Man (translit. Chelovek-amfibiya) is a 1962 Soviet science fiction romance film starring Vladimir Korenev and directed by Vladimir Chebotaryov and Gennadi Kazansky. The film stars Vladimir Korenev and Anastasiya Vertinskaya in the lead roles.

It is an almost fable-like story based upon the eponymous 1928 novel by Alexander Beliaev. It focuses on a youth named Ichthyander (Ichtiandr) (from Greek: fish+man) who was surgically altered to survive under the sea. Unlike traditional science fiction movies of the time the film focuses much more on the concept of love won and lost. It was given the name of Tarzan des Mers before the estate of Edgar Rice Burroughs took exception.

The film was the leader of Soviet distribution in 1962, with 65.5 million admissions during its initial run that year. It later sold up to 100million admissions including re-runs, the highest for a Soviet film up until The Red Snowball Tree (1974).

Plot 
The story is set in a seaside port in Argentina (but filmed in Baku, Azerbaijan SSR), largely among a community of pearl fishers.
The protagonist is the adopted son of a doctor/scientist who was sometime in the past forced to save the boy's life by implanting him with shark gills. Thus he is able to live under water, but must keep his secret from the world.
The conflict arises from his falling in love with a pearl-fisher's beautiful daughter. His secret is discovered and the girl's husband Pedro attempts to exploit Ichthyander for his ability to find pearls easily. 
Due to being kept caged under water, his ability to breathe in the open air is affected, and he must now live in the sea for several years. Although set free, the lovers are permanently separated from each other.

Although ostensibly a lost-love-tragedy like Romeo and Juliet, the film has a significant focus on greed and commercial exploitation (of the pearl-greedy fishermen), possibly under the influence of Socialist Realism.

Cast

Home media
The Amphibian Man made its debut on DVD on August 21, 2001 where it was released by Image Entertainment. It was later re-released by VFN on July 9, 2015.

Western world 
Amphibian Man is little-known in the West, but has become a cult classic. Hollywood filmmaker Quentin Tarantino cited Amphibian Man as one of his favourite Russian films, stating that he grew up watching an English dubbed version often shown on American television in the 1970s.

There have been accusations that the 2017 Hollywood film, The Shape of Water, plagiarised Amphibian Man. Indie Cinema Magazine noted that both have a similar plot, the use of the name "Amphibian Man" in both films, the Soviet connection in both stories, and the 1962 setting.

References 
 Wingrove, David. Science Fiction Film Source Book (Longman Group Limited, 1985)

Notes

Sources

External links

 Amphibian Man (with English subtitles)

1962 films
1960s science fiction films
Lenfilm films
1960s Russian-language films
Soviet science fiction films
Films shot in Baku
Transhumanism in film
Films directed by Gennadi Kazansky
Films scored by Andrey Petrov
Films based on Russian novels
Films based on science fiction novels
Films shot in Crimea